Hojjatabad (also Romanized as Ḩojjatābād) is a village in Gonbaki Rural District, Gonbaki District, Rigan County, Kerman Province, Iran. At the 2006 census, its population was 320, in 66 families.

References 

Populated places in Rigan County